Man Detained is a 1961 British crime film directed by Robert Tronson and starring Bernard Archard, Elvi Hale and Paul Stassino.  Part of the long-running series of Edgar Wallace Mysteries films made at Merton Park Studios, it is loosely based on the 1916 novel A Debt Discharged by Edgar Wallace.

The film's sets were designed by the art director Peter Mullins.

Cast
 Bernard Archard as Det. Inspector Verity 
 Elvi Hale as Kay Simpson 
 Paul Stassino as James Helder 
 Michael Coles as Frank Murray 
 Ann Sears as Stella Maple 
 Victor Platt as Thomas Maple 
 Patrick Jordan as Brand 
 Clifford Earl as Det. Sgt. Wentworth 
 Gerald Lawson as Old Man 
 Jean Aubrey as Gillian Murray 
 Gareth Davies as Police Constable

References

Bibliography
 Goble, Alan. The Complete Index to Literary Sources in Film. Walter de Gruyter, 1999.

External links

1961 films
British crime films
1961 crime films
Films set in England
Merton Park Studios films
Films directed by Robert Tronson
Films based on British novels
Edgar Wallace Mysteries
1960s English-language films
1960s British films